Roy S. Harte (May 27, 1924 – October 26, 2003) was an American jazz drummer and co-founder of Nocturne Records and Pacific Jazz Records.  In partnership with Remo Belli, the founder and namesake of internationally famous drumhead manufacturer Remo, he founded "Drum City," a well-known retail drum shop on Santa Monica Boulevard in West Hollywood, California. Harte appeared in Leedy drums endorsement ads in the late 1950s to early 1960s.

Selected discography

As leader
Perfect Percussion: The 44 Instruments of Roy Harte & Milt Holland, World-Pacific Records (1961)

As sideman

References

External links

Roy Harte discography on Discogs.
Roy Harte obituary.

American jazz drummers
Big band drummers
Cool jazz drummers
West Coast jazz drummers
Mainstream jazz drummers
Swing drummers
Musicians from Los Angeles
1924 births
2003 deaths
American people of Russian descent
American jazz percussionists
American session musicians
20th-century American drummers
American male drummers
Batá drummers
Bongo players
Jazz musicians from California
20th-century American male musicians
American male jazz musicians